The Denmark national rugby league team represents Denmark in the sport of rugby league. They are official observers of members of the Rugby League European Federation. Danish rugby league stats, news, team results and other information can be seen on Denmark's RLEF Page.

History
Denmark participated in rugby league in the late 2008. The national team lost their first match in 2009, 28–26 to Norway in Copenhagen.

They  first won in 2011 in the Nordic Cup (Between Denmark, Norway and Sweden).  In 2014, they beat Sweden and Norway to become the first team to win the Nordic Cup twice . They then became the first team to retain the Nordic Cup in 2015 after beating Sweden and Norway to win their third trophy.

The first domestic tie (actually including the Scania region of Sweden) was between København RLFK (precursor to Copenhagen RLFC) and Sweden Barbarians in 2012.

Current squad
2014 Nordic Cup
Josh Whitehead
Morten Dam
Emil Borggren
Martin Pedersen-Scott
Christoffer Ellebirke
Justin Eyles
Viiga Lima
Jesper Ika
Rich Groom
Andrei Ungureanu
Orveh Melchior
Neil Smith
Eugene Hanrahan
Rob King
Thor Thomsen
Silas Mubanda
Mark Bailey

All-time Results Record

Results

Domestic Teams
All of the Danish national team are selected from either Jutland RLFC (Jylland) and Copenhagen RLFC .

Other
Since 2013, the Denmark rugby league team have promoted the Cystic Fibrosis Forening, the national cystic fibrosis association of Denmark.

See also

Danish Rugby League Championship
Denmark Rugby League Federation

References

External links

Rugby league in Denmark
National rugby league teams
Rugby League